Iván Mauricio Juárez (born October 20, 1976 in San Francisco (Córdoba), Argentina) is an Argentine footballer. He currently plays for CA Mitre in Argentina.

Teams
 Atlético Rafaela 2001-2002
 Macará 2002
 Atlético Rafaela 2003-2004
 Banfield 2004
 Ferro Carril Oeste 2005
 Atlético Rafaela 2005–2013
 Sportivo Belgrano 2013-2014
 CA Mitre 2014-

Titles
 Atlético Rafaela 2003-2004 (Primera B Nacional Championship)
 Atlético Rafaela 2010-2011 (Primera B Nacional Championship)

References

External links
 Profile at BDFA 
 

1976 births
Living people
Argentine footballers
Argentine expatriate footballers
C.S.D. Macará footballers
Club Atlético Banfield footballers
Ferro Carril Oeste footballers
Atlético de Rafaela footballers
Argentine Primera División players
Expatriate footballers in Ecuador
People from San Francisco, Córdoba
Association footballers not categorized by position
Sportspeople from Córdoba Province, Argentina